Miguel Ángel Rugilo (January 19, 1919 in Buenos Aires, Argentina – September 16, 1993 in Buenos Aires, Argentina) was an Argentine footballer who played for clubs of Argentina, Brazil, Chile and Mexico.

Career
Rugilo debuted in first division in 1937 playing for Vélez Sársfield against River Plate at Estadio Monumental, where Vélez was beaten 3-0. Rugilo would last 5 matches else replacing Jaime Rotman, who was injured. By 1942 Rugilo consolidated as titular goalkeeper, playing in the División de Ascenso (then Primera B). In 1943 Vélez won the championship promoting to Primera with Rugilo in the goal. A year later, he was sold to Club León of México returning to Vélez in 1945.

In 1945 the Argentina national team coach, Guillermo Stábile called Rugilo to play two matches in the United Kingdom, facing England and Ireland. Although Rugilo only played four matches for the Argentina national team, he gained recognition on May 9, 1951, when Argentina played against England at Wembley Stadium. Although Argentina was beaten 2-1, journalists praised his performance at the match, nicknaming him "El León de Wembley" ("The Lion of Wembley") and he would be called that way until his death in 1993.

Soon after his memorable performance at Wembley, Rugilo suffered a severe injure, breaking his leg. At the end of 1952 he left Vélez as a free player, being hired in 1953 by the Brazilian team Palmeiras, returning then to Argentina to play for Tigre and later moving to O'Higgins of Chile. Rugilo retired in 1958 at 41.

In his own words
In 1972, Rugilo gave an interview to an Argentine magazine, where he detailed some anecdotes of his most famous match:

References

External links
 
 

1919 births
1993 deaths
Argentine footballers
Argentine expatriate footballers
Argentina international footballers
Sociedade Esportiva Palmeiras players
Club León footballers
Club Atlético Tigre footballers
Club Atlético Vélez Sarsfield footballers
O'Higgins F.C. footballers
Liga MX players
Expatriate footballers in Chile
Expatriate footballers in Brazil
Expatriate footballers in Mexico
Association football goalkeepers
Footballers from Buenos Aires